Capitol Collectors Series is a 1989 compilation album by American singer Frank Sinatra.

Track listing

References

1989 compilation albums
Frank Sinatra compilation albums